Georg Zellhofer (born 25 August 1960) is a football manager and a former player from Austria.

References

1960 births
Living people
People from Waidhofen an der Ybbs
Austrian footballers
Austrian Football Bundesliga players
Association football midfielders
SK Sturm Graz players
LASK players
Austrian football managers
SK Rapid Wien managers
FK Austria Wien managers
LASK managers
Footballers from Lower Austria